Tango is a 1981 Polish animated short film written and directed by Zbigniew Rybczyński. It won the Academy Award for Best Animated Short Film at the 55th Academy Awards.

Summary
The film depicts an initially empty room. A ball bounces in through the window, and a boy enters to retrieve it and leaves. This series of actions repeats over and over, gradually accompanied by more and more repeating paths of different people through the room. The film ends with the people eventually leaving the room  and the boy throws the ball through the window one last time, landing near an old woman lying down. She then gets up, picks up the ball and leaves through the door near her.

Accolades
Academy Award for Best Animated Short Film

See also
Independent animation
Cinema of Poland
1981 in film

References

External links
 
 Dancing into Acoustic Space

1981 films
1981 animated films
1980s animated short films
Polish animated short films
Animated films without speech
Best Animated Short Academy Award winners
Polish avant-garde and experimental films
1980s avant-garde and experimental films